Joshy Mangalath is an Indian film  screenwriter who made his debut with the feature film Ottaal for which he got the National award for the Best Screenplay (adapted). In 2015, he received the National Film Award for Best Screenplay (adapted) for the 2014 Malayalam film Ottaal, at the 62nd National Film Awards.

Early life 
He was born in Kottayam, Kerala.

Career 
Ottaal is his first screenplay realized as film, which won him a National Award. Ottaal (A wicker basket for catching fish) story is based on Anton Chekhov's short story 'Vanka'. 'Vanka' is a tale of an orphan boy who works under a cobbler and the hardships he endures.  It was film Director Jayaraj who has asked Joshy to do a Screenplay based on Vanka.

Awards 
 National Film Award 
 2014 - 62nd National Film Awards - Ottaal BEST SCREENPLAY (Adapted)

Filmography

Screenwriter

References

External links

  imdb
  manoramaonline.com
  Mathrubhumi
 Asia Pacific Screen Award (APSA) Brisbane,Australia
 Tale of innocence and neglect – The Hindu
 Penning the Pangs of Humans, Nature – The New Indian Express
  Mangalam
 Not much to cheer for Malayalam cinema – The Hindu
  62nd National Film Awards: – The Times of India
  Malayali UAE resident wins National award – Gulf News
 Dubai based Indian writer Joshy Mangalath wins National Award – Emirates 24/7
 Official website

Living people
Malayalam screenwriters
People from Thiruvananthapuram district
Screenwriters from Kerala
Indian male screenwriters
1966 births
Best Adapted Screenplay National Film Award winners